George Graham (16 August 1838 – 22 July 1922), was a farmer and politician in colonial Victoria, Australia, as Minister of Water Supply 1890–1893.

Graham was born in Linlithgow, West Lothian, Scotland, the son of George Graham, farmer, and his wife Ellen, née Hardy.

Graham was returned to the district of Moira in the Victorian Legislative Assembly  in June 1884. Graham held this seat until its abolition in March 1889. He was then elected for the new Numurkah and Nathalia district in April 1889, which he held until May 1904 when it was abolished. In November 1890 he accepted office in James Munro's Government as Minister of Water Supply (5 November 1890 – 23 January 1893), and was sworn of the Executive Council. Graham then represented Goulburn Valley from June 1904 to November 1914.

Graham died in Numurkah, Victoria on 22 July 1922.

References

1838 births
1922 deaths
Members of the Victorian Legislative Assembly
Scottish emigrants to colonial Australia
People from Linlithgow
Burials in Victoria (Australia)
Victorian Ministers for Agriculture